M.V.Muthiah Govt. Arts College for Women is a women's public college on the outskirts of Dindigul, India.

Degrees offered
 Bachelor of Arts, Master of Arts
 Bachelor of Commerce
 Bachelor of Science, Master of Science

Departments
 Department of physics
 Department of Chemistry
 Department of Commerce
 Department of Computer Science
 Department of Economics
 Department of English
 Department of Geography
 Department of History
 Department of Mathematics
 Department of Tamil
 Department of Zoology
Department of Botany
Department of BBA

Notable alumni
 L. Shanthi, Class of 1989 (English), founder and CEO Tarka Systems, Inc,  USA

Educational institutions established in 1966
Women's universities and colleges in Tamil Nadu
1966 establishments in Madras State
Dindigul
Education in Dindigul district